Acacia islana is a shrub belonging to the genus Acacia and the subgenus Phyllodineae that is native to parts of north eastern Australia.

Description
It is glabrous and slightly resinous with grey to brownish coloured branchlets that have tuberculate-ribs making it appear quite bumpy. Like most species of Acacia it has phyllodes rather than true leaves. They are quite are scattered often appearing in clusters of two or three. When it blooms it produces simple inflorescences that occur singly in the axils made up of a single spherical flower-head that is composed of 20 to 30 light golden coloured flowers.

Distribution
The shrub has a limited distribution in the central region of Queensland to the south of Theodore in the Isla Gorge National Park where it is found on hillsides, ridge tops and other places growing in sandstone based soils as a part of open Eucalyptus woodland communities. It is found in and around the Isla Gorge National Park, Precipice National Park, Expedition National Park, Carnarvon Gorge National Park, Coominglah State Forest the small town of Widbury. There are around nine populations in Isla Gorge National, Park with some forming dense stands, it is also considered quite common in Precipice National Park and around Widbury. It is often associated with Acacia hockingsii, Eucalyptus decorticans, Eucalyptus exserta, Eucalyptus cloeziana, Corymbia trachyphloia, Eucalyptus dura, Lysicarpus angustifolia and Corymbia watsoniana.

See also
List of Acacia species

References

islana
Flora of Queensland
Plants described in 1980
Taxa named by Leslie Pedley